Wedding Dress is a South Korean drama film, released on January 14, 2010.

Plot
Go-eun (Song Yoon-ah), a wedding dress designer and single mom, has only a limited number of days to live. Before parting from her young daughter So-ra (Kim Hyang-gi), Go-eun wants to do everything she can for her, including making a beautiful wedding dress for So-ra for the future. As her condition worsens, So-ra finds out about the cancer and tries to fulfill her mother's wishes one by one, in secret.

Cast
Song Yoon-ah as Seo Go-eun
Kim Hyang-gi as Jang So-ra
Kim Myeong-gook as Jeong-woon
Jeon Mi-seon as Ji-hye
Kim Yeo-jin as Mi-ja
Kim Ye-ryeong as Yeo-woon
Jung In-seo as Jung-ahn
Lee Ki-woo as Ji-hoon
Min Ah-ryeong as Soo-ran
Chae Sang-woo as Min-woo 
Kwon Soo-hyeon as Min-hye 
Kim Dong-yeop as Yeo-woon's son
Kim Soo-ha as Jin-ah 
Ji Woo as Jin-ah's friend 1
Ko Joo-yeon as Jin-ah's friend 2 
Lee Seung-yeon as So-ra's homeroom teacher 
Kim Tae-jeong as Ko-woon's friend
Yang Jin-sung as adult So-ra
 Tae In-ho as resident.

References

External links 
  
 Wedding Dress at Naver 
 
 
 

2010 films
South Korean drama films
2010s Korean-language films
2010 drama films
Sidus Pictures films
Films about dresses
2010s South Korean films